Mama Always Told Me may refer to:

"Mama Always Told Me", by rapper Silkk the Shocker Charge It 2 da Game (1998)
"Mama Always Told Me", by Sleepy Brown
"Mama Always Told Me", by rapper G-Eazy from The Beautiful & Damned (2017)